Wagarville is an unincorporated community in Washington County, Alabama, United States. As of 2010, the population of the area was 3,353. Wagarville lost its status as a CDP sometime after the 2010 census, as it never appeared on the 2020 census data for Alabama CDPs

References

Unincorporated communities in Washington County, Alabama
Unincorporated communities in Alabama